The Ukrainian sovereignty referendum was conducted on March 17, 1991, as part of the first and only Soviet Union referendum. Throughout the Ukrainian Soviet Socialist Republic, voters were asked two questions on remaining part of the Soviet Union on New Union Treaty terms. Most voters supported the proposal, however, in the pro-independence Oblasts of Ivano-Frankivsk, Lviv, and Ternopil, voters opted for independence as part of an additional question.

The referendum followed the Declaration of State Sovereignty of Ukraine by the republic's parliament on July 16, 1990, as sovereign republic within the Soviet Union, in line with the results. 

In August 1991, with the New Union Treaty having not been adopted by the USSR, the withdrawal from the Soviet Union was proposed. The overwhelming majority of voters backed the idea in another referendum in December, approving a declaration of independence.

Republic-wide

Throughout the entire Soviet Union, citizens were first asked:

Do you consider necessary the preservation of the Union of Soviet Socialist Republics as a renewed federation of equal sovereign republics in which the rights and freedom of an individual of any nationality will be fully guaranteed?

A boycott campaign reduced the against votes in Western Ukraine. The Ukrainian SSR included an additional question for all of the republic's citizens; the voters were asked:

Do you agree that Ukraine should be part of a Union of Soviet Sovereign States on the basis on the Declaration of State Sovereignty of Ukraine?

Provincial

In the Galician provinces of Ivano-Frankivsk, Lviv, and Ternopil, voters were asked an additional question regarding the creation of an independent state of Ukraine:

Would you like Ukraine became an independent state, which can independently decide all questions of domestic and foreign policy, providing equal rights to citizens regardless of nationality and religious views?

References

1991 elections in Ukraine
1991 in international relations
1991 in the Soviet Union
Ukraine
Dissolution of the Soviet Union
March 1991 events in Europe
Referendums in the Soviet Union
Referendums in Ukraine
Ukraine
Ukrainian independence movement